Mesquite Buckaroo is a 1939 American black-and-white Western film. Directed by Harry S. Webb and scripted by George H. Plympton, the film was produced by Metropolitan Pictures and distributed by State Rights. It features Bob Steele as Bob Allen, a champion rodeo-playing cowboy, who is kidnapped by "Trigger" Carson, played by Charles King, and his gang of crooks. Mesquite Buckaroo was released in the United States on May 1, 1939.

See also
 Bob Steele filmography

External links
 
 
 

1939 films
American Western (genre) films
American black-and-white films
Films directed by Harry S. Webb
1939 Western (genre) films
1930s English-language films
Films with screenplays by George H. Plympton
Films about kidnapping
1930s American films